Den Za Den (Macedonian: Ден За Ден; trans. Day After Day) was a Yugoslav jazz rock group formed in Skopje in 1978. Although short-lived, the band is one of the most notable representatives of the Yugoslav jazz rock scene.

Band history

1978 - 1980
Den Za Den was formed in 1978. The first lineup of the band featured Dragiša Soldatović (keyboards), Vladimir Jankulovski (bass guitar), Dmitar Čočorovski (drums) and Siniša Stojanovski (guitar). During the year, the band made their first recordings, for RTV Skopje. In October of the same year, they were joined by second guitarist, Arijan Dema (a former Pu member).

In 1978, the band appeared on BOOM Festival. In 1979, they appeared on Festival Omladina and on the Rock Evening of Opatija Festival. The song "Ciganka" ("Gypsy") they performed on the Opatija Festival was released on various artists album Opatija '79 - Rock grupe (Opatija '79 - Rock Bands) during the same year. In 1980, the band released their debut album, produced by Ivo Umek and entitled simply Den Za Den. During the same year, the band once again appeared on Opatija Festival, and the song "Jutro i noć" ("Morning and Night") appeared on the various artists album JRT - Opatija '80 - Rock veče (JRT - Opatija '80 - Rock Evening). However, Den Za Den saw little attention in the media, and the band ended their activity soon after.

Post breakup
Dragiša Soldatović continued his career as a member of the jazz band Labish Trio, which he formed with bass guitarist Zoran Pavlovski and drummer Koki Dimuševski. They released their debut album, Labish Trio, in 1996. In 1998, Labish Trio recorded their second album, Dream, in the lineup that featured Soldatović on piano, Darko Mučov on bass guitar and Goce Stefkovski on drums.

Discography

Studio albums
Den Za Den (1980)

Other appearances
"Ciganka" (Opatija '79 - Rock grupe, 1979)
"Jutro i noć" (JRT - Opatija '80 - Rock veče, 1980)
"Den za den" (Jazz Fair / Sajam jazza, 1980)

References

External links 
Den Za Den at Discogs
Den Za Den at Prog Archives

Macedonian rock music groups
Macedonian jazz-rock groups
Macedonian progressive rock groups
Yugoslav rock music groups
Yugoslav jazz-rock groups
Yugoslav progressive rock groups
Instrumental rock musical groups
Musical groups established in 1978
Musical groups disestablished in 1980